Ystads IF is a handball club from Ystad, Sweden. They play in Handbollsligan. They won the Swedish Championship in 1976, 1992 and 2022.

History
Ystads IF was founded in 1908 and took up handball on the programme in 1929. In 1933–34, the club won an unofficial six-team league consisting of teams from the cities of Ystad and Kristianstad. In the same season, they made their debut in Svenska mästerskapet (SM), a tournament held to determine the Swedish Champions. They were eliminated by Flottans IF Karlskrona in their first match. Ystads IF played in the highest division, at the time known as Allsvenskan, for the first time in 1940–41, but were relegated after one season. They were promoted again in 1943 and in the same season reached the semi-finals of SM, where they were defeated by Västerås HF. In 1945–46, Ystads IF finished second in the league. They  reached the SM semi-finals in 1946–47, but lost to Redbergslids IK. They were relegated from Allsvenskan in the following season. They played in Allsvenskan again from 1954 to 1957. Ystads IF were promoted back to Allsvenskan in 1968 and finished fourth in the league in 1968–69. By this time, the SM tournament had been discontinued and the Swedish Champions were determined by a playoffs tournament between the four highest-placed teams in the league. They defeated HK Drott in the semi-finals but lost against SoIK Hellas in the finals. They were relegated in 1972 but promoted again after a single season. In 1975–76, Ystads IF finished second in the league and won their first Swedish Championship, winning against IFK Malmö in the semi-finals and IK Heim in the finals. Two years later, they won the regular season but lost the semi-finals against Lugi HF. In 1978–79, they finished second in the league and lost the finals against Drott. In the following season they finished second in the league again and also again lost the finals, this time to Lugi. They won the regular season in 1980–81, but lost their third consecutive final, against Vikingarnas IF. Ystads IF finished second in the league in 1981–82 and 1982–83 and won the league in 1983–84, but were eliminated in the semi-finals in each of those seasons. They reached the playoffs again in 1986–87 and 1987–88, but were defeated by Redbergslids IK in the semi-finals both times. In 1990–91, they finished third in the league, which had been renamed Elitserien and with the playoffs having been expanded to six teams. They eliminated Redbergslid in the quarter-finals but lost against Irsta HF in the semi-finals. In 1991–92, Ystads IF won the regular season and also their second Swedish Championship, defeating Drott in the final series. In the following season they finished third in Elitserien, and their title defence ended in the semi-finals against IK Sävehof. In 1993–94 they were relegated from Elitserien. They were promoted in the following season but were relegated again a year later. They did not return to Elitserien until 2006. By this time the playoffs hand been expanded to eight teams. They finished fifth in the league, but were eliminated by Redbergslid in the quarter-finals. Since returning to the top division, Ystads IF have reached the semi-finals in 2007–08, 2009–10, 2011–12, 2014–15, 2015–16 and 2016–17, but lost each time. In 2021–22 they reached the finals, and managed to win their first Swedish Championship in 30 years.

Crest, colours, supporters

Kits

Sports Hall information

Name: – Ystad Arena
City: – Ystad
Capacity: – 2700
Address: – Fridhemsgatan 27, 271 45 Ystad, Sweden

Team

Current squad 

Squad for the 2022–23 season

Technical staff
 Head coach:  Oscar Carlén
 Assistant coach:  Marcus Lindgren
 Goalkeeping coach:  Mattias Andersson
 Fitness coach:  Philip Åkesson
 Physiotherapist:  Jesper Lindgren

Transfers
Transfers for the 2023–24 season

Joining 

Leaving 
  Jonathan Svensson (LB) (to  HC Erlangen)

Previous Squads

European record

EHF European Cup
The EHF European Cup is an annual men's handball club competition organised by the European Handball Federation (EHF). It is the third-tier competition of European club handball, after the EHF Champions League and the EHF European League. Founded in 1993 as the EHF City Cup, it was renamed EHF Challenge Cup in 2000, and EHF European Cup from the 2020–21 season.

EHF ranking

Former club members

Notable former players

  Kim Andersson (1998–2001, 2015–)
  Mattias Andersson (1985–1998)
  Robert Andersson (1990–1992)
  Oscar Carlén (2005–2008)
  Per Carlén (1991–2000)
  Josip Cavar (2014–2016)
  Dalibor Doder (2019–2022)
  Niclas Ekberg (2009–2010)
  Jim Gottfridsson (2011–2013)
  Pierre Hammarstrand (2007–2014)
  Robert Hedin (1982–1990, 2003–2004)
  Tony Hedin (1987–1993, 2002–2004)
  Kurt-Göran Kjell (1962–1963, 1968–1969)
  Fredrik Larsson (2004–2005)
  Magnus Lindén (2006–2010)
  Anton Månsson (2021–)
  Lukas Nilsson (2013–2016)
  Fredrik Ohlander (2012–2014)
  Mats Olsson (1994–1996)
  Anders Persson (2007–2008, 2014–2020)
  Carl Basti Rasmussen (1974–1991)
  Lukas Sandell (2013–2018)
  Sebastian Seifert (2009–2013)
  Philip Stenmalm (2021–)
  Martin Bager (2011–2016)
  Henrik Knudsen (2019–2020)
  Kaupo Palmar (2008–2009)

Former coaches

References

External links
  
 

Swedish handball clubs
Sport in Ystad